Charlott Maria Strandberg (born 20 September 1962 in Täby, Sweden) is a Swedish revue-singer and actress. She belongs to the Strandberg family; she is granddaughter to Olle Strandberg and half-sister to Evabritt Strandberg.

Selected filmography
1988 – Xerxes
1989 – Hajen som visste för mycket
1990 – Macken – Roy's & Roger's Bilservice
1994 – Bert
1994 & 1996 – Svensson, Svensson (TV)
1996 – Älskade Lotten (TV)
1996 – Monopol
2006 – LasseMajas detektivbyrå
2009 – Virus i bataljonen

References

External links

Charlott Strandberg on Swedish Film Database

Living people
1962 births
Swedish actresses
Swedish women singers